Qaleh-ye Khvajeh (also Romanized as Qal‘eh-ye Khvājeh; also known as Khvājeh and Qal‘eh Khvājeh’ī) is a village in Rostaq Rural District, in the Central District of Neyriz County, Fars Province, Iran. At the 2006 census, its population was 238, in 58 families.

References 

Populated places in Neyriz County